Freedom Area Senior High School is a public high school in Freedom, Pennsylvania, United States.  It is the only high school in the Freedom Area School District. Athletic teams compete as the Freedom Bulldogs in the Western Pennsylvania Interscholastic Athletic League.

Notes and references

External links
 District Website

Public high schools in Pennsylvania
Schools in Beaver County, Pennsylvania
Education in Pittsburgh area